Buell is an unincorporated community in northern Montgomery County, Missouri, United States. It is located approximately five miles northeast of Montgomery City on Route 161.

Buell was platted in 1903, and named after Buell Hensley, a local businessman. A post office called Buell was established in 1904, and remained in operation until 1978.

Demographics

References

Unincorporated communities in Montgomery County, Missouri
Unincorporated communities in Missouri